The Norwegian Second Division is the third level of ice hockey in Norway. It is below the First Division.

Teams
The following clubs are as, of October 2018, playing in the 2. divisjon for the 2018–19 season.

Champions

External links
 Norwegian Ice Hockey Federation

Nor
Professional ice hockey leagues in Norway